The 1981–82 Bradford City A.F.C. season was the 69th in the club's history.

The club finished 2nd in Division Four, being promoted to Division Three, reached the 1st round of the FA Cup, and the 3rd round of the League Cup.

The club was promoted to Division Three at the end of the season, player-manager Roy McFarland's first season in charge.

Sources

References

Bradford City A.F.C. seasons
Bradford City